The Tennessee Code Commission is one of the 30 or more commissions, boards, and committees that provide assistance to the state court system.  The commission consists of five members of which three are ex officio: the Chief Justice of Tennessee, the attorney general and reporter, and the director of legal services for the legislature.  The chief justice appoints the two other members. The commission publishes, sells, and distributes the compilation of laws, statutes, and codes of the state.

External links
 Tennessee Code Commission website

Government of Tennessee
Tennessee state courts
Tennessee law
Courts and tribunals with year of establishment missing